HD 86264 b is an extrasolar planet which orbits the F-type main sequence star HD 86264, located approximately 237 light years away in the constellation Hydra. The planet is considered to orbit in an eccentric path around the star with a period of about four years. This planet can be as close as 0.86 AU to as far as 4.86 AU. It has minimum mass seven Jupiter masses and orbits at a distance of 2.86 astronomical units. This planet was detected by radial velocity method on August 13, 2009.

An estimate of the planet's inclination and true mass via astrometry, though with high error, was published in 2022.

References

External links
 PlanetQuest, HD 86264 b

Exoplanets discovered in 2009
Giant planets
Hydra (constellation)
Exoplanets detected by radial velocity
Exoplanets detected by astrometry